The 1951 National Challenge Cup was the 38th edition of the USSFA's annual open soccer championship. The German Hungarian S.C. from Eastern New York defeated the Pittsburgh Heidelberg to win.

External links
 1951 U.S. Open Cup – TheCup.us

Lamar Hunt U.S. Open Cup
U.S. Open Cup